Colonel Sir Henry Wilmot, 5th Baronet  (3 February 1831 – 7 April 1901) was an English recipient of the Victoria Cross, the highest and most prestigious award for gallantry in the face of the enemy that can be awarded to British and Commonwealth forces.  He was also a Conservative Party politician.

Early life
Wilmot was born in Chaddesden, near Derby the son of Sir Henry Wilmot (4th Baronet) and his wife Maria Mundy daughter of Edmund Mundy of Shipley Hall. He was educated at Rugby School.

Military career

Wilmot purchased a commission as an Ensign in the 43rd (Monmouthshire) Regiment of Foot. Two years later he purchased a Lieutenancy and in 1855 purchased a Captaincy in the same regiment. Later in 1855 he transferred to the Rifle Brigade, still as a Captain.
Wilmot served as a captain in the 2nd Battalion, The Rifle Brigade (Prince Consort's Own) and later was on the staff of Brigadier General Hope Grant. It was while assigned to the staff that he fought in the Indian Mutiny; on 11 March 1858 at Lucknow, India, along with Private David Hawkes and Corporal William Nash, the following deed led to his being awarded the Victoria Cross:

Later, he served in the Central Indian campaign of 1858 and the Second China War.

In 1862, Wilmot retired from the regular army having been appointed a Major in the Volunteer Force unit, the 1st Administrative Battalion, Derbyshire Rifle Volunteers. Appointment as lieutenant colonel of the Derbyshire Rifle Volunteers followed in 1863. Further recognition was made in 1868 when Wilmot was appointed as a Deputy Lieutenant of Derbyshire In 1881 he was granted the honorary rank of colonel of the Derbyshire Rifle Volunteers, prior to resigning his commission and being appointed honorary Colonel of the Derbyshire Rifle Corps. With the expansion of the Volunteer Force Wilmot was appointed as brigade commander of the North Midland Brigade in 1888 with the substantive rank of Colonel in the Volunteer Forces an appointment he held until 1895.

Personal life
Wilmot married Charlotte Pare (1838–1891) in 1862. He succeeded to the baronetcy of Wilmot of Chaddesden on the death of his father in 1872 and was made a Companion of the Bath in the Civil Division of the Order (CB) in 1881. A final honour in 1898 was to be appointed a Knight Commander of the Bath (KCB).

Henry Wilmot died of pneumonia on 7 April 1901 at his home in Bournemouth and was buried at St Mary's Church, Chaddesden.

Political career
Wilmot sat as a Member of Parliament (MP) for South Derbyshire from 1869 to 1885. He was also an alderman of Derbyshire and had been chairman of the County Council.

Notes

Further reading 
Monuments to Courage (David Harvey, 1999)
The Register of the Victoria Cross (This England, 1997)

External links
 

1831 births
1901 deaths
Burials in Derbyshire
Baronets in the Baronetage of Great Britain
People from Chaddesden
Military personnel from Derbyshire
Rifle Brigade officers
British recipients of the Victoria Cross
Indian Rebellion of 1857 recipients of the Victoria Cross
Conservative Party (UK) MPs for English constituencies
Members of the Parliament of the United Kingdom for constituencies in Derbyshire
Sherwood Foresters officers
Knights Commander of the Order of the Bath
British Army personnel of the Second Opium War
Volunteer Force officers
British Army recipients of the Victoria Cross
Deputy Lieutenants of Derbyshire
43rd Regiment of Foot officers
Deaths from pneumonia in England
People educated at Rugby School
UK MPs 1868–1874
UK MPs 1874–1880
UK MPs 1880–1885